Defending champion Martina Hingis defeated Conchita Martínez in the final, 6–3, 6–3 to win the women's singles tennis title at the 1998 Australian Open.

This was the first major in which future world No. 1 and 23-time major singles champion Serena Williams competed in the main draw. She was defeated by her sister Venus in the second round.

Nirupama Vaidyanathan became the first Indian woman in the Open Era to contest, and to win, a major singles match.

Seeds

Qualifying

Draw

Finals

Top half

Section 1

Section 2

Section 3

Section 4

Bottom half

Section 5

Section 6

Section 7

Section 8

References

External links
 1998 Australian Open – Women's draws and results at the International Tennis Federation

Women's singles
Australian Open (tennis) by year – Women's singles
1998 in Australian women's sport